The Anglican Diocese of Pankshin is one of ten within the Anglican Province of Jos, itself one of 14 provinces within the Church of Nigeria. The current bishop is Olumuyiwa Ajayi.

Notes

Church of Nigeria dioceses
Dioceses of the Province of Jos